The ischiopubic ramus is a compound structure consisting of the following two structures:
 from the pubis, the inferior pubic ramus 
 from the ischium, the inferior ramus of the ischium

It forms the inferior border of the obturator foramen and serves as part of the origin for the obturator internus and externus muscles. Also, most adductors originate at the ischiopubic ramus.

The fascia of Colles is attached to its margin.

References

External links
 

Bones of the pelvis